The 1976 Indiana Hoosiers football team was an American football team that represented the Indiana Hoosiers in the 1976 Big Ten Conference football season. The Hoosiers played their home games at Memorial Stadium in Bloomington, Indiana. The team was coached by Lee Corso, in his fourth year as head coach of the Hoosiers.

Schedule

Players selected in the 1977 NFL Draft

References

Indiana
Indiana Hoosiers football seasons
Indiana Hoosiers football